St Vincent was a three-masted sailing ship that was built in England in 1865, renamed Axel in 1894 and scrapped in 1907. For the first part of her career she was a clipper, trading between London and Adelaide. She was later re-rigged as a barque, and spent the final part of her career she was under Norwegian ownership.

Building
Pile, Hay & Co of Sunderland built St Vincent in 1865, launching her on 22 July and completing her that September. She was of composite construction (iron frame and timber planking). As built, she was a full-rigged ship.

Her first owner was Devitt and Moore's Adelaide Line, who registered her in London. Her United Kingdom official number was 52770 and her code letters were HDRK.

Career
On her maiden voyage she left Plymouth 14 September 1865, with Captain Alexander Louttit, formerly of the Sea Star, as her Master. He remained her captain until 1873, and went on to command the Rodney.

In 1884 her sail plan was reduced to a barque. In 1894 J Beyson of Kristiansand bought St Vincent and renamed her Axel. In 1896 GT Jorgensen, also of Kristiansand, bought her. She was scrapped in Dunkerque in 1907.

Some other clippers on the England to Adelaide run

References

Bibliography

1865 ships
Full-rigged ships
Sailing ships of Norway
Sailing ships of the United Kingdom